Naranammoozhy is a village and panchayat within Ranni taluk of Pathanamthitta district in Kerala state, India.

History 
The present day inhabitants of Naranamoozhy are the migrated farmers and rehabilitated people.  It is believed that in the past, there existed a culture here which can easily be understood from the remains of certain sculptures, graves, houses and temples. Remnants of an old temple and pond were found at a place called Edakkunnam. The Aarattu ceremony associated with the festivals of Edamuri temple was conducted at the place 'Arattumannu'. At present, the people here live in religious harmony and prosperity with mutual understanding.

Etymology 
Once a person named 'Narayanan' lived here on the banks of the Pamba river, and thus the place got its name Narayanamoozhy which in course became Naranammoozhy.

Demographics
As of the 2001 census, Naranammoozhy had a population of 15988, of whom 7928 were male and 8060 were female. The sex ratio was 1017, which was below the state average. About 94.6% of the total population was literate. Male literacy was 95.47% and female literacy was 92.9%.

Administration
The panchayat spreads over the Ranni-Pazhavangadi, Athikkayam and Kollamula villages in Ranni taluk with an area of 33.61 km². The panchayath shares its boundary with Kollamula on the north, Perunad on the south and east and Ranni-Pazhavangadi on the west. Naranammoozhy panchayat, which was formed in 1983, is further divided into 13 wards for administrative convenience.

Wards
 Edamury
 Kurumbanmoozhy
 Thompikandam
 Chembanoly
 Kadumeenchira
 Kudamurutty
 Athikayam
 Poopalli
 Chollanavayal
 Adichipuzha
 Kakkudumon
 Ponnampara
 Naranammoozhy

Geography 
It is basically a mid-land region with beautiful landscapes, fertile soil and abundant forests. The holy river Pamba flows through the place westwards.

Economy 
Naranamoozhy's economy is predominantly agrarian based. Rubber is widely cultivated here with suitable climate and geographic conditions.

Places of interest 
 Kakkattukoikkal Sastha temple, Perunad 
 Perunthenaruvi Falls
 Nilakkal St. Thomas Ecumenical Church
India Pentecostal Church of God
 Bethany ashram, Perunad
 Kattukal stream
St George Orthodox Church,Naranamoozhy

References 

Villages in Pathanamthitta district

ml:നാറാണംമൂഴി ഗ്രാമപഞ്ചായത്ത്